The 51st World Science Fiction Convention (Worldcon), also known as ConFrancisco, was held on 2–6 September 1993 at the ANA Hotel, Parc Fifty Five, and Nikko Hotels and the Moscone Convention Center in San Francisco, California, United States.

The supporting organization was San Francisco Science Fiction Conventions, Inc. The chairman was David W. Clark.

Participants 

Attendance was 6,602, out of 7,725 paid memberships.

Guests of Honor 

The Guests of Honor were called "Honored Guests".

 Larry Niven
 Alicia Austin
 Tom Digby
 Jan Howard Finder
 Mark Twain (Dead GoH; "channeled" by Jon DeCles)
 Guy Gavriel Kay (toastmaster)

At this convention, as one of the "Honored Guests", Larry Niven was carried around the convention in a sedan chair by his fans while wearing a crown.

Awards

1993 Hugo Awards 

 Best Novel:
 A Fire Upon the Deep by Vernor Vinge
 and Doomsday Book by Connie Willis (tie)
 Best Novella: "Barnacle Bill the Spacer" by Lucius Shepard
 Best Novelette: "The Nutcracker Coup" by Janet Kagan
 Best Short Story: "Even the Queen" by Connie Willis
 Best Non-Fiction Book: A Wealth of Fable: An Informal History of Science Fiction in the 1950s by Harry Warner, Jr.
 Best Dramatic Presentation: "The Inner Light" (Star Trek: The Next Generation episode)
 Best Professional Editor: Gardner Dozois
 Best Professional Artist: Don Maitz
 Best Original Artwork: Dinotopia by James Gurney
 Best Semiprozine: Science Fiction Chronicle, edited by Andrew I. Porter
 Best Fanzine: Mimosa, edited by Dick Lynch & Nicki Lynch
 Best Fan Writer: Dave Langford
 Best Fan Artist: Peggy Ranson

Other awards 

 Special Award: Takumi Shibano
 John W. Campbell Award for Best New Writer: Laura Resnick

Notes 

ConFrancisco was the last Worldcon not to have its own official website.

The original plan of San Francisco Science Fiction Conventions, Inc. was to hold the convention at the futuristic San Francisco Marriott Marquis, designed by the noted architect Anthony J. Lumsden, which is topped with a jukebox shaped glass tower that makes it look like a skyscraper from a Flash Gordon comic strip by Alex Raymond. This building is a notable example of futurist architecture. However, the hotel backed out of the contract when a more lucrative larger convention wanted to schedule there on the same weekend.

See also 

 Hugo Award
 Science fiction
 Speculative fiction
 World Science Fiction Society
 Worldcon

References

External links 

 NESFA.org: The Long List
 NESFA.org: 1993 convention notes 
 Hugo.org: 1993 Hugo Awards

1993 conferences
1993 in California
1993 in the United States
Culture of San Francisco
Fisherman's Wharf, San Francisco
Science fiction conventions in the United States
South of Market, San Francisco
Worldcon